deal.II is a free, open-source library to solve partial differential equations using the finite element method.  The current release is version 9.4, released in June 2022. It is one of the most widely used finite element libraries, and provides comprehensive support for all aspects of the solution of partial differential equations. The founding authors of the project — Wolfgang Bangerth, Ralf Hartmann, and Guido Kanschat — won the 2007 J. H. Wilkinson Prize for Numerical Software for deal.II. However, it is today a worldwide project with around a dozen "Principal Developers", to which over the years several hundred people have contributed substantial pieces of code or documentation.

Features 
The library features
 dimension independent programming using C++ templates on locally adapted meshes,
 a large collection of different finite elements of any order: continuous and discontinuous Lagrange elements, Nedelec elements, Raviart-Thomas elements, and combinations,
 parallelization using multithreading through TBB and massively parallel using MPI. deal.II has been shown to scale to at least 16,000 processors and has been used in applications on up to 300,000 processor cores.
 multigrid method with local smoothing on adaptively refined meshes
 hp-FEM
 extensive documentation and tutorial programs,
 interfaces to several libraries including Gmsh, PETSc, Trilinos, METIS, VTK, p4est, BLAS, LAPACK, HDF5, NetCDF, and Open Cascade Technology.

History and Impact 
The software started from work at the Numerical Methods Group at Heidelberg University in Germany in 1998. The first public release was version 3.0.0 in 2000. Since then deal.II has gotten contributions from several hundred authors and has been used in more than 2,000 research publications.

The primary maintainers, coordinating the worldwide development of the library, are today located at Colorado State University, Clemson University, Heidelberg University, Texas A&M University, Oak Ridge National Laboratory and a number of other institutions. It is developed as a worldwide community of contributors through GitHub that incorporates several hundred changes by dozens of authors every month.

See also 
 List of finite element software packages
 List of numerical analysis software

References

External links 

Source Code on Github
List of Scientific publications

Free computer libraries
Differential calculus
Finite element software for Linux
C++ numerical libraries
Software that uses VTK